The MCC team that toured Australia in the 1936–37 season also played three first-class matches in New Zealand at the end of the tour in March and April 1937. They played no Test matches in New Zealand, although one of the matches was against a representative New Zealand XI, all of whose team members went on the tour of England barely six weeks later where three Test matches were played.

Representative match

References

External links
 M.C.C. in New Zealand, 1936-37 at Cricinfo

Further reading
 Don Neely & Richard Payne, Men in White: The History of New Zealand International Cricket, 1894–1985, Moa, Auckland, 1986, pp. 139–41

1937 in English cricket
1937 in New Zealand cricket
New Zealand cricket seasons from 1918–19 to 1944–45
1936-37
International cricket competitions from 1918–19 to 1945